Liechtenstein competed at the 1972 Summer Olympics in Munich, West Germany. Six competitors, all men, took part in eleven events in four sports.

Cycling

One cyclist represented Liechtenstein in 1972.

Individual road race
 Paul Kind — did not finish (→ no ranking)

Gymnastics

Men's Competition
 Bruno Banzer

Judo

Men's Competition
 Armin Büchel
 Hansjakob Schädler

Shooting

Two male shooters represented Liechtenstein in 1972.

50 m rifle, prone
 Louis Frommelt
 Remo Sele

References

External links
Official Olympic Reports

Nations at the 1972 Summer Olympics
1972
1972 in Liechtenstein